Prayer is the active effort to communicate with a higher being, deity, or spirit. 

Prayer or Prayers may also refer to:

Religion
 Absentee funeral prayer, a kind of funeral prayer in Islam
 Eid prayers, special prayers offered to celebrate the two Islamic festivals
 Friday prayer, a prayer that Muslims hold every Friday
 Nafl prayer, a type of optional Muslim prayer
 Rain prayer, a prayer to request rain from God in Islam
 Sunnah prayer, an optional or supererogatory prayer in Islam

Music

Prayer (album), 2014 album by Robin Schulz
"Prayer" (Disturbed song), a 2002 song by Disturbed
Prayers (duo), American  electronic rock duo
"The Prayer" (Celine Dion and Andrea Bocelli song), 1998
"The Prayer" (Bloc Party song), 2007 
"Prayer", a song in the musical The Scarlet Pimpernel
"Prayer", a 1997 song by Sevendust from Sevendust
"Prayer", a 1999 song by Secret Garden from Dawn of a New Century
"Prayer", a 2000 song by Neurosis from Sovereign
"Prayer", a 2002 song by Celine Dion from A New Day Has Come
"Prayer", a 2004 song by Nami Tamaki from Greeting
"Prayer", a 1934 song written by Richard Rodgers and Lorenz Hart for the movie Hollywood Party (1934 film)
"Prayers", a 2006 song by In This Moment from Beautiful Tragedy
"Prayers", a 2018 song by Good Charlotte from Generation Rx
"A Prayer", a song by Kings Kaleidoscope from their album 2016 album Beyond Control
"The Prayer", a 2008 song by Kid Cudi from A Kid Named Cudi
"The Prayer", a 2017 song by Lala Hsu from The Inner Me

Other uses
"Prayer", a poem by Patti Smith in the book kodak
Prayer (legal term), an official description of a plaintiff's demands
"Prayer" (Farscape episode)
The Prayer (film), a 2018 film
The Prayer (sculpture), a 1909 bronze by Auguste Rodin

See also
Pray
Praying (disambiguation)